() is an English loanword of the Chinese word for involution.  is made of two characters which mean “inside” and “rolling”.  has disseminated to nearly all works of life in mainland China in the recent few years, due to the uneven distribution of social, economic, and educational resources and ongoing economic malaise, especially in terms of higher education bodies and labour markets.  reflects a life of being overworked, stressed, anxious and feeling trapped, a lifestyle where many face the negative effects of living a very competitive life for nothing.

Origin and Conceptualization 
Involution was developed as a sociological concept by American anthropologist Alexander Goldenweiser in his 1937 book Anthropology: An Introduction To Primitive Culture. In this work, Goldenweiser identifies involution as a cultural process. That when a society reaches its final form it cannot evolve nor stabilise itself. Instead, it can only complicate its internal elements. Goldenweiser uses Maori decorative art as an example. The development of art was done within the framework of already existing patterns. The final pieces were elaborate and complicated in appearance but fundamentally the same as already existing patterns.  

This term was later utilised by fellow American anthropologist Clifford Geertz, who popularised the term in his 1963 book Agricultural Involution: The Processes of Ecological Change in Indonesia. In this work, Geertz analysed the rice farming process following Dutch colonial rule. Geertz found that despite the complexity of the process, coupled with the increasing amount of labour being assigned to it, productivity remained stagnant. All these greater efforts to increase productivity yielded little results. All this did was complicate the already existing processes and systems. For Geertz this was involution.

Dissemination in China 
In contemporary China, the concept of  has spread in modern societies through media outlets like newspapers and social media platforms like Weibo.  has become so popular because it has a high influence on the ways of living for youth and contemporary middle-class parents. The spread of the word  can be tracked in the timeline below.

Tsinghua’s Involuted King (卷王） 
In September 2020, a picture of a university student from one of the elite universities, Tsinghua went viral on social media platforms with more than 1 billion views. The picture of the boy working on his laptop while still riding his bike resonated with most millennials or generation Z which includes people born after the 1990s. 

This incident sparked others to post more pictures of other hard-working students who became the involuted kings. The likes and reposting of similar pictures made  to be among China’s top 10 buzzwords of the year.

in the tech industry 
In 2021, the concept of university  translated into China’s hypercompetitive tech industry, which is the preferred destination for most graduates. With an increasing number of graduates with relevant educational qualifications, the job market is becoming very competitive. This leaves many to work in areas they are overqualified for like becoming takeaway drivers. In association with these views, these pictures were popularised.

996 working culture 

Many graduated students get involved in a 996 working culture, like takeaway services, after they leave the universities. Some of the picture shows takeaway drivers are trying their best to deliver the food on behalf of Meituan (美团), a high-tech delivery-service corporation, with a high level of competitive business culture. Many workers, including the takeaway drivers, are just like robots. They are working extremely hard, but with no real purpose.

Culture areas associated with

Education

Parents’ views on education involution 
Parents feel the need to overcompensate just to ensure their Children won’t fall back on the social ladder in the coming years. These intensified efforts are through active involvement and financial spending. Parental involvement is manifested in the following ways. First, parents prefer to familiarise themselves with the content of what is being taught at school, this is to ensure they can teach their children when needed. It has become a common occurrence for parents to buy 3 books in subjects like maths, one book for the student, one for the parents and one to be left at work. Second, compared to their western counterparts, the struggle of choosing the best educational institutions starts as early as daycare and not pre-university. Parents are anxious because of the increasing competition, correspondingly they start getting fully involved in their children’s education from a very young age. Time has become a significant factor because actions must be taken at the right time otherwise it will be too late

Third, parents now find themselves in positions where they must push their children very hard, and children have little to no say. Pressuring their children is a characteristic that model middle-class parents share. This behaviour has popularised words like ‘’ (‘chicken child’), ‘tiger mom’, and ‘chicken blood’, referring to the ambitious parenting of contemporary Chinese parents. A tiger mom is a controlling mother who does not allow their children any freedom. Examples of Tiger mom behaviour is making primary school children study subjects like chemistry and physics through after-school tutoring even though the syllabus introduces these subjects in the third year of junior secondary school. One parent explained ‘it is not enough to compete just in terms of studies,’ having some sort of talent is now seen as a significant entry requirement to elite universities. As a result, playing the piano and swimming are not valuable talents as they once were, as shown in the valuable skill chains below.Moreover, contemporary middle-class Chinese parents are overcompensating for the cost spent on their children’s education. In recent years there has been a trend for parents to relocate to Haidian, a district in Beijing. Haidian is the most famous home for self-sacrificing and education-focused parents, this is because of the strong public institutions found in the area. Schools in Haidian teach programming from a very young age, by the time these children are in high school they are at an advanced level in coding languages like C++ and python. It is the desire of most parents to move to cities with quality public schools like the city of Haidian, regardless of the cost. Therefore, to ensure their children attend esteemed schools, parents pay high real estate prices because of the overpriced markets.

University students’ views on education involution 
In university, learning takes a more independent approach, where students become responsible for themselves and are in control of what and when they learn. Though university is thought of as a time to make new friends, explore new interests and even understand oneself better, the reality is different in China. As a result, there is an increasing number of incidents where students are taking studying to disturbing extremes. One such example is Tsinghua’s involuted king. Behind the above notion is the function of higher-level institutions as agents for elite talent selection therefore, with the depreciating academic qualifications most students feel the need to perform beyond average. The rising generation of ‘involuted’ young students gets involved in an endless cycle of competition and self-flagellation until all knowledge is becoming meaningless.

Work-life Balance 
In China, the work-life of younger social elites is very different from their predecessors. Young people are trapped in hyper-competitive and unhealthy work environments as ‘the new industry standards’. To ensure they stay relevant at work, employees are trapped in the 996 work culture. 996 is the new industry requirement for good-paying industries like finance and tech where employees work from 9 am to 9 pm for 6 days a week. Under 996 employees work more than 60 hours a week, a number that is 1.5 times more than the legalized 44 hours a week as stated in article 36 of the labour law. Moreover, though the labour law requirement asks for workers to be paid 2.275 times their base salary if they work under the 996 schedule, there are reports that workers are rarely compensated. In efforts to highlight their frustration a number of programmers have created websites like 996icu and posted a blacklist of companies that encourage these exploitative work cultures. However, these efforts are in vain since  has made entry into these jobs very difficult therefore there is no turning back ‘their greatest fear is perhaps losing what they already have,’ there is no escaping.  Finally, many workers, including the takeaway drivers, are just like robots. They are working extremely hard, but with no real purpose.

Responses

Generation Gap 
The previous generation came of age during the opening up of China’s economy, who experienced large social mobility and the creation of markets in many sectors. Xiang Biao pointed out that people from the previous generation had a more secure childhood and upward mobility.  Now that the markets in many sectors are largely saturated in these sectors and social mobility has stagnated, Gen Z does not enjoy the same kind of abundance of opportunity

Anticapitalistic Sentiment 
The overworking culture that constituted much of the  has engendered an anti-capitalistic sentiment from the overworked population. The Former Chief Editor of Harper’s Bazaar China, Su Mang, called  ‘the gap between desire and indolence’. Su has been lambasted as a ‘typical capitalist’ and forced to apologise. Jack Ma, called 996 a ‘fortune earned through hard work’, and was labelled a ‘bloodsucking capitalist’.

(Lying Flat) 

Government Encouragement of  
The government’s position on this is largely positive and encouraging, as it is perceived workers working hard would drive up the economy. 

Xu Fang from University of California, Berkeley proposes that this is a part of the ‘stability maintenance’ effort from the ruling party; the government would rather people vent their emotions through ranting online rather than a social movement

See also 

 996 working hour system
 Labor relations in China
 Education in China
 Chicken-blood therapy
 Tang ping
 Overwork
 Occupational burnout
 Agricultural Involution
 Social structure of China

Notes

References

Further reading 
Benny. (2022, June 13). 上海封城引爆 “润学”讨论，内卷、躺平后中国年轻人开始“润”了？.[After the lockdown of Shanghai, China's young people began to "embellish" the discussion?]. BBC News Chinese. Retrieved November 17, 2022, from https://www.bbc.com/zhongwen/simp/chinese-news-61760256

Feng, E., & Cao A. (2022, June 3). Hard work is a point of pride in China. but a culture of slacking off is now in Vogue. NPR. Retrieved November 17, 2022, from https://www.npr.org/sections/goatsandsoda/2022/06/03/1102405433/work-culture-sang-work-ethic-chinese-culture

Peizemaduxinli. (2019, May 2). 专制型父母教育出来的孩子，失掉的不是自我，而是整个人生. [Authoritarian parents education out of the children, lose not self, but the whole life.]. Retrieved November 17, 2022, from https://www.sohu.com/a/311434883_120020281

Yan M. (2021, November 2). The new popular parenting term in China is ‘jiwa’ - or ‘Chicken blood’ parenting. Insider. Retrieved November 17, 2022, from https://www.insider.com/jiwa-parenting-why-is-it-so-popular-in-china-2021-10

Yang D. (2021, June 4). Faster, higher, stronger: China's kids pushed to Breaking Point. ThinkChina. Retrieved November 17, 2022, from https://www.thinkchina.sg/faster-higher-stronger-chinas-kids-pushed-breaking-point

Yu X. (2020, September 22). 余秀兰：父母社会背景、教育价值观及其教育期望  研究.  搜狐. [Yu Xiulan: A Study on Parents' Social Background, Educational Values and Educational Expectations. Sohu.]. Retrieved November 17, 2022, from https://www.sohu.com/a/419942282_387114

Chinese culture